Alum Rock may refer to:
Alum rock, a specific chemical compound and a class of chemical compounds
Alum Rock, California, US, formerly a town, now a neighborhood of San Jose, California
Alum Rock Park, in San Jose, California
Alum Rock, Pennsylvania
Alum Rock, Birmingham, an area in the UK, two miles east of Birmingham's city centre
Alum Rock (ward)